924 Forestville St. is the debut album by American punk rock band Bracket, released by Caroline Records in 1994.  Recording sessions were held at Prairie Sun Studios in Cotati, California, with producer Joe Marquez.

Bracket issued two singles from the album, including "Why Should Eye" in the United States and "Huge Balloon" released in the United Kingdom.  924 Forestville St. is likely a tongue-in-cheek reference combining the name of longtime Bay Area punk rock establishment 924 Gilman Street with the band's nearby hometown of Forestville, California.

Track listing
All songs written and composed by Bracket.
"Get It Rite" – 2:55
"Dodge Ball" – 3:42
"Missing Link" – 3:26
"Sleep" – 4:16
"Huge Balloon" – 2:47
"Stalking Stuffer" – 2:59
"Why Should Eye" – 2:26
"Warren's Song, Pt. 1" – 1:56
"Warren's Song, Pt. 2" – 2:47
"Can't Make Me" – 3:26
"Skanky Love Song" – 3:28
"J. Weed" – 3:13
"Rod's Post" – 2:51

Personnel
 Marty Gregori – lead vocals, guitars
 Larry Tinney – guitars
 Zack Charlos – bass guitar
 Ray Castro – drums
 Joe Marquez – producer, engineer
 Bracket – producer, design concept
 Alan Douches – mastering (West West Side)
 Mark Edward – backing vocals on "J. Weed" and "Rod's Post"
 Pat Gillis – backing vocals on "J. Weed" and "Rod's Post"
 Troy Hahn – photography
 Ray Hall – photography
 Joey Hall – photography
 Pete Ciccone – design execution
 Tom Bejgrowicz - design execution

References

1994 debut albums
Bracket (band) albums
Caroline Records albums